Whitefish Bay is a self-unloading lake freighter that entered service with Canada Steamship Lines (CSL) in 2013. Built in China, the vessel is the third of CSL's  ships. Whitefish Bay is used primarily to transport goods on the North American Great Lakes and the St. Lawrence Seaway.

Design and description

Whitefish Bay is a self-unloading lake freighter, the third of the Canada Steamship Lines' (CSL) . CSL asserts that the new vessels will be more efficient than existing vessels, and will leave less pollution. However, on the CSL website, the ship is stated as having a DWT of 34,500 tons.

The ship is powered by one IMO Tier III MAN B&W 6S50ME diesel engine driving one shaft creating .

The vessel is used to transport large bulk cargoes such as coal and ore on the Great Lakes and St. Lawrence Seaway.

Construction and career
Whitefish Bay was constructed at the Chengxi shipyard in Jiangyin, China with the yard number 9303. The lake freighter's keel was laid down on 11 May 2012 and was launched on 23 July 2012. The ship was completed on 8 May 2013. Comedian Rick Mercer broadcast a recording of his visit to Whitefish Bay as it transited the lowest lock on the Welland Canal. The vessel is registered in Canada.

The ship went aground on 12 July 2016 at Hamilton Island in the Saint Lawrence Seaway east of Cornwall, Ontario while carrying a load of coal. According to the Department of Fisheries and Oceans, the ship suffered a massive power failure, which caused it to run aground. The ship was refloated on 14 July with the aid of tugboats and was to be taken to Saint-Zotique, Quebec for inspection.

References

External links
 

2012 ships
Canada Steamship Lines
Great Lakes freighters
Ships built in China